Ross Township, Kansas may refer to one of the following places:

 Ross Township, Cherokee County, Kansas
 Ross Township, Osborne County, Kansas

See also 

Ross Township (disambiguation)

Kansas township disambiguation pages